There are 126 municipalities in the canton of Fribourg, Switzerland.

List 

Attalens
Auboranges
Autigny
Avry
Bas-Intyamon
Belfaux
Belmont-Broye
Billens-Hennens
Bois-d'Amont
Bösingen
Bossonnens
Botterens
Broc
Brünisried
Büchslen
Bulle
Chapelle (Glâne)
Châtel-Saint-Denis
Châtel-sur-Montsalvens
Châtillon (FR)
Châtonnaye
Chénens
Cheyres-Châbles
Corbières
Corminboeuf
Corpataux-Magnedens
Cottens (FR)
Courgevaux
Courlevon
Courtepin
Cressier (FR)
Crésuz
Cugy (FR)
Delley-Portalban
Düdingen
Echarlens
Ecublens (FR)
Estavayer
Ferpicloz
Fétigny
Fräschels
Fribourg
Gibloux (FR)
Giffers
Givisiez
Gletterens
Grandvillard
Granges (Veveyse)
Granges-Paccot
Grangettes
Greng
Grolley
Gruyères
Gurmels
Haut-Intyamon
Hauterive (FR)
Hauteville
Heitenried
Jaun
Kerzers
Kleinbösingen
La Brillaz
La Roche
La Sonnaz
La Verrerie
Le Châtelard
Le Flon
Le Mouret
Le Pâquier (FR)
Les Montets
Lully (FR)
Marly
Marsens
Massonnens
Matran
Ménières
Meyriez
Mézières (FR)
Misery-Courtion
Mont-Vully
Montagny (FR)
Montet (Glâne)
Morlon
Muntelier
Murten
Neyruz (FR)
Nuvilly
Pierrafortscha
Plaffeien
Plasselb
Pont-en-Ogoz
Pont-la-Ville
Ponthaux
Prévondavaux
Prez
Rechthalten
Remaufens
Riaz
Ried bei Kerzers
Romont (FR)
Rossens (FR)
Rue
Saint-Aubin (FR)
Saint-Martin (FR)
Sâles
Schmitten (FR)
Semsales
Sévaz
Siviriez
Sorens
St. Silvester
St. Ursen
Surpierre
Tafers
Tentlingen
Torny
Treyvaux
Ueberstorf
Ulmiz
Ursy
Val-de-Charmey
Vallon
Vaulruz
Villars-sur-Glâne
Villarsel-sur-Marly
Villaz
Villorsonnens
Vuadens
Vuisternens-devant-Romont
Wünnewil-Flamatt

Mergers

As of 1 January 1994
the municipalities Léchelles and Chandon merged under the name of Léchelles.

As of 1 January 2000
the municipalities Grolley and Corsalettes merged under the name of  Grolley.
the municipalities Gurmels and Kleingurmels merged under the name of  Gurmels.
the municipalities Montagny-la-Ville and Montagny-les-Monts merged under the name of  Montagny (FR).

As of 1 January 2001
the municipalities Maules, Romanens, Rueyres-Treyfayes and Sâles merged under the name of  Sâles.
the municipalities Bionnens, Mossel, Ursy and Vauderens merged under the name of  Ursy.
the municipalities Gillarens, Promasens and Rue merged under the name of  Rue.
the municipalities Lentigny FR, Lovens and Onnens FR wurden merged under the name of  La Brillaz.
the municipalities Chavannes-sous-Orsonnens, Orsonnens, Villargiroud and Villarsiviriaux wurden merged under the name of  Villorsonnens.
the municipalities Marsens and Vuippens merged under the name of  Marsens.
the municipalities Ecuvillens and Posieux wurden merged under the name of  Hauterive (FR).

As of 1 January 2002
the municipalities Albeuve, Lessoc, Montbovon and Neirivue merged under the name of  Haut-Intyamon.

As of 1 January 2003
the municipalities Avry-devant-Pont, Le Bry and Gumefens merged under the name of  Pont-en-Ogoz.
the municipalities Gurmels, Guschelmuth, Liebistorf and Wallenbuch merged under the name of  Gurmels.
the municipalities Les Ecasseys, Estévenens, La Joux (FR), Lieffrens, La Magne, Sommentier, Villariaz and Vuisternens-devant-Romont merged under the name of  Vuisternens-devant-Romont.
the municipalities Courtaman and Courtepin merged under the name of  Courtepin.
the municipalities Estavayer-le-Gibloux, Rueyres-Saint-Laurent, Villarlod and Villarsel-le-Gibloux merged under the name of  Le Glèbe.
the municipalities Bonnefontaine, Essert, Montévraz, Oberried FR, Praroman and Zénauva merged under the name of  Le Mouret.

As of 1 January 2004
the municipalities Bouloz, Pont (Veveyse) and Porsel merged under the name of  Le Flon.
the municipalities Mannens-Grandsivaz and Montagny (FR) merged under the name of  Montagny (FR).
the municipalities Besencens, Fiaugères and Saint-Martin (FR) merged under the name of  Saint-Martin (FR).
the municipalities La Corbaz, Cormagens and Lossy-Formangueires merged under the name of  La Sonnaz.
the municipalities Berlens and Mézières (FR) merged under the name of  Mézières (FR).
the municipalities Middes and Torny-le-Grand merged under the name of  Torny.
the municipalities Aumont, Frasses, Granges-de-Vesin and Montet (Broye) merged under the name of  Les Montets.
the municipalities Enney, Estavannens and Villars-sous-Mont merged under the name of  Bas-Intyamon.
the municipalities Chavannes-les-Forts, Prez-vers-Siviriez, Siviriez and Villaraboud merged under the name of  Siviriez.
the municipalities La Neirigue and Vuisternens-devant-Romont merged under the name of  Vuisternens-devant-Romont.
the municipalities Le Crêt, Grattavache and Progens merged under the name of  La Verrerie.

As of 1 January 2005
the municipalities Delley and Portalban merged under the name of  Delley-Portalban.
the municipalities Chapelle (Broye) and Cheiry merged under the name of  Cheiry.
the municipalities Cordast and Gurmels merged under the name of  Gurmels.
the municipalities Cugy FR and Vesin merged under the name of  Cugy FR.
the municipalities Praratoud and Surpierre merged under the name of  Surpierre.
the municipalities Lussy FR and Villarimboud merged under the name of  La Folliaz.

As of 1 January 2006
the municipalities Botterens and Villarbeney merged under the name of  Botterens.
the municipalities Bulle and La Tour-de-Trême merged under the name of  Bulle.
the municipalities Autavaux, Forel (FR) and Montbrelloz merged under the name of  Vernay.
the municipalities Esmonts and Vuarmarens merged under the name of  Vuarmarens.
the municipalities Bollion, Lully (FR) and Seiry merged under the name of  Lully (FR).
the municipalities Agriswil and Ried bei Kerzers merged under the name of  Ried bei Kerzers.

As of 1 January 2011
the municipalities Corbières and Villarvolard merged under the name of Corbières.

As of 1 January 2012
the municipalities Estavayer-le-Lac and Font merged under the name of Estavayer-le-Lac.
the municipalities Ursy and Vuarmarens merged under the name of Ursy.

As of 1 January 2013
the municipalities Büchslen and Murten merged under the name of Murten.

As of 1 January 2014
the municipalities Cerniat and Charmey merged under the name of Val-de-Charmey.

As of 1 January 2016
the municipalities Domdidier, Dompierre, Léchelles and Russy merged under the name of Belmont-Broye.
the municipalities Autafond and Belfaux merged under the name of Belfaux.
the municipalities Corpataux-Magnedens, Farvagny, Le Glèbe, Rossens and Vuisternens-en-Ogoz merged under the name of Gibloux.
the municipalities Bas-Vully and Haut-Vully merged under the name of Mont-Vully.

As of 1 January 2017
the municipalities Bussy, Estavayer-le-Lac, Morens, Murist, Rueyres-les-Prés, Vuissens and Vernay merged under the name of Estavayer.
the municipalities Châbles and Cheyres merged under the name of Cheyres-Châbles.
the municipalities Surpierre and Villeneuve merged under the name of Surpierre.
the municipalities Chésopelloz and Corminboeuf merged under the name of Corminboeuf.
the municipalities Barberêche, Courtepin, Villarepos and Wallenried merged under the name of Courtepin.
the municipalities Oberschrot, Plaffeien and Zumholz merged under the name of Plaffeien.

As of 1 January 2020
the municipalities La Folliaz and Villaz-Saint-Pierre merged under the name of Villaz
the municipalities Corserey, Noréaz and Prez-vers-Noréaz merged under the name of Prez

As of 1 January 2021
the municipalities Alterswil, St. Antoni and Tafers merged under the name of Tafers
the municipalities Arconciel, Ependes and Senèdes merged under the name of Bois-d'Amont
the municipalities Cheiry and Surpierre merged under the name of Surpierre

As of 1 January 2022
the municipalities Galmiz, Gempenach and Murten merged under the name of Murten
the municipalities Clavaleyres (BE) and Murten merged under the name of Murten

planned
the municipalities Avry, Belfaux, Corminboeuf, Fribourg, Givisiez, Granges-Paccot, Marly, Matran and Villars-sur-Glâne

References 

 
Fribourg
Subdivisions of the canton of Fribourg